Cheloy Velicaria-Garafil is a Filipino lawyer and former journalist who serves as the Secretary of the Presidential Communications Office.

Education
Garafil attended the University of Santo Tomas (UST) where she graduated with a communication arts degree. She later pursued law studies in the same university, then passed the bar examination in 2003.

Career

Journalism
Prior to working in the government, Garafil served as a reporter for the newspaper Malaya. She also worked for the Philippine Daily Globe and the Central News Agency of Taiwan.

Government
Garafil worked as a prosecutor for the Department of Justice during the administration of President Gloria Macapagal Arroyo

On October 7, 2022 Garafil resigned as chair of the Land Transportation Franchising and Regulatory Board (LTFRB) to assume the position of Officer in Charge of the Office of the Press Secretary. The office would later be reorganized as the Presidential Communications Office on December 29, 2022. She would lead the office under a regular capacity when she took oath as Press Secretary on January 10, 2023.

References 

Date of birth missing (living people)
Living people
Bongbong Marcos administration cabinet members
University of Santo Tomas alumni
Filipino newspaper people
Year of birth missing (living people)